The 2012 Grambling State Tigers football team represented Grambling State University in the 2012 NCAA Division I FCS football season. The Tigers were led by head coach Doug Williams in the second season of his second tenure as head coach and eighth overall after coaching the Tigers from 1998 to 2003. They played their home games at Eddie Robinson Stadium. They were a member of the West Division of the Southwestern Athletic Conference (SWAC) and finished the season with an overall record of one win and ten losses (1–10, 0–9 SWAC).

Schedule

Reference:

References

Grambling State
Grambling State Tigers football seasons
Grambling State Tigers football